Schwind is a German surname. Notable people with the surname include:

 Moritz von Schwind (1804–1871), Austrian painter
 Arthur Edwin Schwind (1889–1968), American baseball player

Companies
 Schwind eye tech solutions

German-language surnames